Weightman is an English surname. Notable people with the surname include:

Cody Weightman (born 2001), Australian rules footballer
Dale Weightman (born 1959), Australian rules footballer
Eric Weightman (1910–2002), English footballer
Gavin Weightman (born 1945), British journalist and historian
George W. Weightman, U.S. Army Family Medicine physician
John Grey Weightman (1809–1872), British architect
Laura Weightman (born 1991), English middle-distance runner
Lisa Jane Weightman (born 1979), Australian long-distance runner
Roger Chew Weightman (1787–1876), American politician, civic leader, and printer
William Weightman (1813–1904), chemical manufacturer
William Weightman, love interest of Anne Brontë

See also
Weightmans, UK law firm
Wightman (disambiguation)
Whiteman (disambiguation)
Wigman